O'Che 1867 is a family-owned goldsmith and jewelry business in Macau, China. It was founded in 1867 during the reign of the Tongzhi Emperor in the Qing dynasty. The family's history in the business spans four generations and has witnessed the city's historical changes and economic development. The name "O'Che 1867" was originally "Ourivesaria Che Lee Yuen," whereas "Ourivesaria" is Portuguese for goldsmiths and "Che" ("Tse" in Hong Kong) is the romanized form of the family's Chinese surname.

History

1850: Founder, Mr Che Yue Tong was born in Macau
1867: At the age of 17, Mr Che set up "Ourivesaria Che Lee Yuen" in Kiu Tsai Tou, Macau.
1880: Began making gold jewelry
1910-20: Two sons, Choi Sang and Wing Sang joined the business, shop moved to No. 24 Rua dos Mercadores.
1942: The third generation, Chi San (son of Choi Sang) joined the company.
1944-46: First in the Greater China region to use electrolysis to refine gold in commercial scale and first to use carbon for dissolving platinum.
1967: 100th Anniversary of the Company
1992: Business expanded and shop moved to the present address at Rua F.X. Pereira 105A.
1996: Chi San's second son, Stephen Tse, the 4th generation joined the business.
1997: The Company's sub-brand - RingMaster, a totally new concept jewelry store was created and opened, the first of its kind in Macau.
2007: 140th Anniversary of the Company. A brand new concept store was established in the Grand Canal Shoppes, the Venetian Macao, specializing in fine jewelry.
2008: Participated at the "Jewelry Festival 2008" together with over 30 world class jewelry brands, organized by the Grand Canal Shoppes, the Venetian Macao
2008: The Company exhibited for the first time at an international jewelry event, the "JMA Macau 2008"
2008: The Company received the Macau Prime Awards for Brand Excellence 2008
2010: The Company received the Macau Brand Story Award
2012: The Company received the Time-honored Brand Award 2012
2013: The Company participated at the "Jewel & Glamor" of the Macao Fashion Festival 2013
2014: Became the first Macau brand to be recognized as a "China Time-honored Brand" by the China General Chamber of Commerce
2015: Shops opened at the Harborview Hotel, Fisherman Wharf and at No. 16-18 Travessa do Mastro, Macau.
2016: Store opened at the Sands Cotai Central shopping mall.
2017: The Company received the Most Valuable Brand Gold Award, Business Award of Macau 2017.
2017: 150th Anniversary of the Company
2018: On-line shops opened at T-Mall
2018: Store opened at Huafa Mall in Zhuhai, China
2019: The company received the "MARCA TIPICA DE MACAU" (Macau Classic Brand) Award
2019: The company was appointed to create the crown for Miss Macau Pageant 2019 and became the official sponsor and manufacturer of the crowns for the event.
2022: The Company received the 2022 Macau Excellence Chain Stores and Franchise Brands Award

See also
 List of companies of Macau

References

Newspapers

Apple Daily:		A34	30 Nov, 2007
Macau Daily:		C9	30 Nov, 2007
Macau Daily:		A10	03 Dec, 2007
Wen Wei Po: 		B5	07 Dec, 2007
Mingpao:	      	         A27	02 Jan, 2008
Hong Kong Economic Times:	A37	25 Mar, 2008
Wen Wei Po: 		A21	07 Dec, 2009
Exmoo News:	        Page27      08 Aug, 2013

Magazines

iMoney:			Issue 006
Phoenix Skyscape: 		No. 04, 2008
Destination Macau:		Aug-Sept 2008
Jewellery News Asia:        Nov 2008
Prime Magazine:		Dec 2008
Jewellery News Asia:	Jan 2009
Prime Magazine:		Jan 2009
SODA Magazine:	        May 2009
Prime Magazine:		Oct 2009
Macao Image:		Issue 54 Jul 2011      
Macau Closer:		Feb 2012        
Macao Ideas:               Issue 2, Summer 2012
Business Intelligence:	Issue 84, Aug 2012
Essential Macau:	Issue 13, April–May 2013
Essential Macau:	Issue 41, Dec 2017-Jan 2018
Aspire:	September 2018
SD Magazine:	Issue 128   Dec 2019

External links

 Official website

Retail companies established in 1867
Retail companies of China
Companies of Macau
Retailing in Macau
Jewellery companies of China
Brands of Macau
Luxury brands
1867 establishments in China
1867 establishments in the Portuguese Empire
19th-century establishments in Macau